Attiki is a neighbourhood of Athens, located to the northwest of the centre. 

The neighbourhood and its central square (Attiki Square) are named after Attica Railways, a railway company that constructed the line Athens-Kifissia-Lavrion. Attiki station was the terminus of this line.

History
During antiquity, Attiki was part of Kolonos and was considered the most aristocratic neighbourhood of Ancient Athens, owing to its proximity to the Cephissus river. Nowadays, this river is hidden under Leoforos Kifissou.

The area was extensively urbanised during the 1960s and 1970s.

References

Neighbourhoods in Athens